Perissopmeros is a genus of spiders in the family Malkaridae. It was first described in 1932 by Butler. , it contains 7 species, all from Australia.

Species

Perissopmeros comprises the following species:
Perissopmeros arkana (Moran, 1986)
Perissopmeros castaneous Butler, 1932
Perissopmeros darwini Rix, Roberts & Harvey, 2009
Perissopmeros foraminatus (Butler, 1929)
Perissopmeros grayi (Moran, 1986)
Perissopmeros mullawerringi (Moran, 1986)
Perissopmeros quinguni (Moran, 1986)

References

Malkaridae
Araneomorphae genera
Spiders of Australia